Willitoft is a hamlet in the East Riding of Yorkshire, England, it forms part of the civil parish of Bubwith. It is situated just south of the A163 road and west of the B1228 road.

See also
Hamlets in England

References

External links

Villages in the East Riding of Yorkshire